is a role-playing video game released by Vic Tokai in Japan for the Super Famicom in 1993. An American version was scheduled in 1994 titled Lost Mission, but was canceled. A quick review of the game was published in Vol. 58 of Nintendo Power with a scheduled release date of March 1994, which criticized the game for its "poor story translation" and "standard RPG play."

Sequel
Shinseiki Odysselya 2 was released in 1995 in Japan.

References

External links
Soundtrack information at SNESmusic

1993 video games
Japan-exclusive video games
Role-playing video games
Super Nintendo Entertainment System games
Super Nintendo Entertainment System-only games
Vic Tokai games
Video games based on Egyptian mythology
Video games based on Greek mythology
Video games developed in Japan
Video games scored by Tenpei Sato
Video games scored by Hisayoshi Ogura
Single-player video games